Dynamo Duck  was the main character in the children's series The Adventures of Dynamo Duck, which aired on television in the early 1990s.

Overview
The origin of the series lies with the French film maker Jean Tourane. During the 1960s, he filmed for a children's television series Saturnin le canard about the duckling Saturnin who had all kinds of adventures. The series was produced using real animals, dressed up with sunglasses, hats, etcetera, inside a miniature world. The series, first produced in 1964 (according to the Internet Movie Database) was shown on French television.

Years later, the footage was bought by the American producer Nathan Sassover. Originally, clips of it, with voices re-dubbed, were used as bumpers leading into and out of commercials on the Fox Kids network. Later, Sassover had the different pieces of film edited in a new way and hired writers to create new characters and storylines to produce a James Bond-style show in a series of two-minute shorts. Again, a small duck was the main character, fighting crimes of the evil Dr. Mortek (a monkey) and other assorted villains. The animals wander around on miniature sets with scale models of trucks and other vehicles. The duck, this time going by the name of "Dynamo Duck", was driving around in a miniature Jaguar.

What makes this series unique prior to the advent of computer animation was the way the mouth movements of the animals, specifically the ducks, with the precise dialog dubbed in gives the appearance of the animals speaking.  The principal duckling was voiced-over by Dan Castellaneta, using a terse, clipped style parodying The Untouchables'''  Robert Stack. The first season aired in 1991 on Fox Kids. The shorts aired once a week during the Fox Kids' Saturday morning line-up in between the half-hour programs. Where it appeared on the schedule wasn't announced and aired at inconsistent times.  Even the promo for the series narrated by Dynamo says "Saturday mornings on FOX", but no specific time ever revealed. For fans to follow and collect the series, it was often necessary to record the entire morning line-up so as not to miss it.  At the end of every show, Dynamo Duck said "We take care of our animals, and so should you!". The second season of Dynamo Duck is widely regarded as vastly inferior to the first that relied more heavily on reuse of footage, and recycled storylines.  Dynamo's voice-over was modified in a manner similar to Don Adams' Get Smart role of Maxwell Smart.  There are over 100 shorts in the series.

Later, in the mid-1990s, the series had a brief afterlife airing overnights on the now defunct Network One (N1).  The episodes were five minutes in length, including end credits.  Many of which were expansions of their two-minute counterparts from Fox Kids.  Some combined two two-minute shorts to make a five-minute double episode with bridges either at the beginning, middle or end of each story, or a combination thereof.  Due to the limited number of indie and low-powered stations that carried Network One, the series aired nearly unnoticed except by night owls.

The scoring was provided by a number of composers often multiple people on the same shorts, including:
Thomas Chase,
Steve Rucker,
Nathan Sassover,
Paul Menichini,
Misho Segal,
Peter Frampton,et al. The characters and their roles 
Dynamo Duck is the top secret agent of D.U.X., which stands for Dynamic Undercover Excellence. Dynamo's nemesis, Dr. Mortek, is the leader of S.K.U.Z., which is Sleazy Killers, Usurpers, and Zealots.  It was also referred to as the Society of Killers, Usurpers and Zealots.  Many other crime and espionage organizations were known by their acronyms.  Such as H.O.A.X. (the Horrible Organization Against Excellence), S.N.O.B. (the Secret Nefarious Order of Blowhards), Y.A.H.O.O. (Yokels Against Happiness, Optimism and Order), G.O.O.F.U.S. (Goons On the Orders to Foul Up Society), T.O.X.I.C. (Totally Obnoxious, Extremely Insidious Criminals), W.H.O.M. (Wiley Horrendous Obnoxious Maniacs), L.U.S.H. (Low, Underhanded Sot-faced Hitmen), and S.N.O.R.E. (Slumbering Nemesis Of Righteousness Everywhere'').  The Loonies are a religious cult living like medieval knights.  Loonies is not an acronym.  Many of the agents working for these organizations were, but not limited to, weasels.

External links
 Dynamo Duck (1990) on IMDB
 Saturnin, le petit canard (1964) on IMDB
 Saturnin on planete-jeunesse.com (French)
 More about the creation of the nineties series

French children's comedy television series
Television series about ducks
Fox Kids

es:Las Aventuras de Saturnino